Paulo Ricardo Oliveira Nery de Medeiros (born 23 September 1962), better known as Paulo Ricardo, is a Brazilian rock singer, songwriter, composer, musician, record producer and occasional actor.

Early life
In his childhood he listened to Nat King Cole and the collections of the famous Big Bands from Toquinho, Vinícius de Morais and Maria Creuza. He joined the band Prisma in the late 1970s and also founded the band Aura in the early 1980s. He rode with a keyboard player Luiz Schiavon, formed Aura, without expressive results.

Career
Early 1983 with Schiavon, he formed the band RPM together with guitarist Fernando Deluqui and drummer Moreno Junior, subsequently replaced by Paulo P. A. Pagni. The album Revoluções por Minuto, was recorded in 1983. The album sold more than 600 thousand copies. The album came with a sound tuned with the best of pop rock of the time (Duran Duran, A-HA, Alphaville (band)) and lyrics with direct influence of progressive rock.

In 1986 they released the live album  Rádio Pirata ao Vivo , which was directed by Ney Matogrosso, and which sold more than 3.7 million copies across the country. 

In 1988 they released the album  RPM  (known as  Os quatro Coiotes ), which was a sales failure selling only 200,000 copies. The atmosphere between the components was not good and with many frictions, mainly from egos, the band broke up the following year.

In 2001, Paulo Ricardo returned to work with RPM partners and released the single "Vida Real". At the end of the same year, work began with MTV Brasil to launch a RPM special with CD and DVD. The album "MTV RPM 2002", sold more than 300,000 copies of the CD and 50,000 copies of the DVD taking RPM back into the spotlight.

In 2003, after disagreements between the members, the RPM is again undone.

In early 2011 Paulo Ricardo and Luiz Schiavon were already composing new songs and rehearsing with Fernando Deluqui and Paulo P.A. Pagni. Where they released the album with new songs “Elektra” was on November 18, 2011.

Solo career
His solo career began shortly after the break with the band RPM. Released in 1989 entitled "Paulo Ricardo", it featured the hits "A Step of Eternity" and "A Fina Poeira do Ar". In 1991, their second album, “Psico Trópico”, was released. 

In 1996, he launched the work “Rock Popular Brasileiro”, where he made a reinterpretation of several classics of rock and national pop. Amor Amor Chosen Me ”from 1997, shows a more romantic Paulo Ricardo and the album presented the hit“ Dois ”
In 2004 the work “Zum Zum” was launched. In 2005, with the band PR.5, he released the CD and DVD Acoustic Live, in which he interprets international successes of bands and singers.

Personal life
Paulo Ricardo is the son of engineer Waldeck Nery de Medeiros and teacher Sônia Oliveira, studied Journalism at USP and worked as a journalist for four years, has two sisters named Cristiane and Rosane, has four children: Paola, Isabela, Luís Eduardo and Diana.
Luciana Vendramini was married for eight years from 1989 to 1996. It was eight years full of jealousy on both sides. At the time, he was 27, and she was 17.
Paulo Ricardo married Gabriela Verdeja in 2005 the couple stayed together for 12 years and separated in 2017. Gabriela is the mother of Isabela, Luís Eduardo and Diana.

Discography
 Paulo Ricardo - 1989
 Psico Trópico - 1991
 Rock Popular Brasileiro - 1996
 O Amor Me Escolheu - 1997
 La Cruz Y La Espada - 1998
 Amor de Verdade - 1999
 Paulo Ricardo - 2000
 Acoustic Live - 2005
 Prisma - 2006
 Novo Álbum - 2016

RPM

1985: Revoluções por Minuto
1987: RPM & Milton
1988: RPM - Quatro Coiotes
1993: Paulo Ricardo & RPM
2011: Elektra
1986: Rádio Pirata Ao Vivo
2002: MTV RPM 2002

References 

Brazilian guitarists
Brazilian rock musicians
Música Popular Brasileira singers
Bossa nova singers
Brazilian male guitarists
Brazilian record producers
Música Popular Brasileira guitarists
Musicians from Rio de Janeiro (city)
20th-century composers
20th-century guitarists
20th-century pianists
20th-century Brazilian male singers
20th-century Brazilian singers
Brazilian male singer-songwriters
1962 births
Living people